Marzouq AlـHubaini Al-Azmi is a member of the Kuwaiti National Assembly, representing the fifth district. Born in 1952, Al-Azmi studied business administration and worked in the National Council before being elected to the National Assembly in 1996.  While political parties are technically illegal in Kuwait, Al-Azmi is part of the Popular Action Bloc.

Mandatory Retirement Age for Teachers
On November 28, 2008, MP Abdullah Al-Roumi joined MPs Khaled AlـSultan Bin Essa, Hassan Johar, Musallam Al-Barrak, and Al-Azmi in formulating a bill to extend the mandatory retirement age for Kuwaiti teaching staff at Kuwait University from 65 to 70 years.  They argued that Item 32 of Law no. 15/1979 has denied the country services of able and intelligent academicians by restricting retirement age of Kuwaitis to 65 years. They recommended that a clause be added to the law such that the retirement age can become 70 years and can further be extended to 75 years.

References

Kuwaiti people of Arab descent
Members of the National Assembly (Kuwait)
Living people
1952 births
Popular Action Bloc politicians